Service-dominant (S-D) logic, in behavioral economics, is an alternative theoretical framework for explaining value creation, through exchange, among configurations of actors. It is a dominant logic. The underlying idea of S-D logic is that humans apply their competences to benefit others and reciprocally benefit from others' applied competences through service-for-service exchange.

Service-dominant logic has been developed by Stephen Vargo and Robert Lusch. The goal of developing S-D logic is to contribute to the understanding of human value co-creation, by developing an alternative to traditional logics of exchange.

Since Vargo and Lush published the first S-D logic article, "Evolving to a New Dominant Logic for Marketing", in 2004, S-D logic has become a collaborative effort of numerous scholars across disciplines and it has been continually extended and elaborated (most frequently by Vargo and Lusch and in doing so, most of their references are their past papers, which should seriously decrease the validity of their papers). Among the most important extensions have been (1) the development of service ecosystems perspective that allows a more holistic, dynamic, and systemic perspective of value creation and (2) the emphasis of institutions and institutional arrangements as coordination mechanisms in such systems.

The core 
At the core of S-D logic is the idea all exchanges can be viewed in terms of service-for-service exchange, the reciprocal application of resources for others' benefit (Vargo and Lusch, 2004). Focus on service (singular) steers attention to the process, patterns, and benefits of exchange, rather than the units of output that are exchanged (e.g., goods). S-D logic argues that in order to create value, that is to maintain and increase wellbeing and viability, actors engage in interdependent and reciprocally beneficial service exchange (Lusch and Vargo, 2014). Hence, value creation occurs in networks in which resources are exchanged among multiple actors and is therefore more accurately conceptualized as value cocreation (Vargo and Lusch, 2008, Vargo, Maglio and Akaka, 2009). Recently, S-D logic has moved toward a dynamic, systems orientation in which value cocreation is coordinated through shared institutions (norms, symbols, and other heuristics), often massive-scale resource integration and service exchange processes (Lusch and Vargo, 2014, Vargo and Lusch 2016).

Axioms and foundational premises 
The core ideas of S-D logic are formulated into foundational premises. Vargo and Lusch put forth the original eight foundational premises of S-D logic in the seminal, 2004 article. Since then, the foundational premises have gone through modifications and additional premises have been added as S-D logic has been extended and elaborated (Vargo and Lusch, 2006, 2008, 2016). Currently, S-D logic has eleven foundational premises (FPs). Five of these have been identified the axioms of S-D logic (Vargo and Lusch, 2016), from which the other FPs could be derived.

The first axiom (FP1) Service is the fundamental basis of exchange is based on the previously introduced definition of service as the application of operant resources (primarily knowledge and skill) for the benefit of another actor. S-D logic argues that it is always fundamentally service, rather than goods, per se, that actors exchange as they strive to become better off. It is important to emphasize that this 'service' (singular), a process, should not be confused with 'services', (usually plural), usually intended to denote a unit of (intangible) output, which is associated with goods dominant (G-D) logic. The first axiom is at the heart of S-D logic, and thus foundational to the other FPs. For example, it implies that (1) goods are distribution mechanisms for service provision (FP3) and (2) all economies are service economies (FP5). It also follows that money, when it is involved in exchanges, represents rights to future service. In other words, money can be viewed as a placeholder for future service and can be understood as a form of indirect service exchange that often masks the fundamental basis of exchange (FP2).

The second axiom (FP6), Value is cocreated by multiple actors, always including the beneficiary, contradicts the traditional worldview, in which firms are seen as the sole creator of value. Rather, it suggests that value is something that is always cocreated through the interaction of actors, either directly or indirectly (e.g., through goods). This axiom also enables one to see more clearly that the service-oriented view is inherently relational, because value does not arise prior to exchange transaction, but rather following it, in the use of the exchanged resources, in a particular context and in conjunction with resources provided by other service providers. This value creation is seen as unfolding, over time, with a consequence of continuing social and economic exchange, implicit contracts, and relational norms. 
The original scope for this axiom was intended to shift the primary locus of value creation from the firm's sphere to the customer's and from the primacy of value-in-exchange, toward the primacy of value-in-use. More recently, S-D logic has begun to use to term value-in-context to capture the notion that value must be understood in the context of the beneficiary's world and the associated resources and other actors (Vargo et al. 2009). This collaborative nature of value creation is best viewed from a higher level of aggregation than the dyad (e.g., meso- or macro levels) (Chandler and Vargo, 2011). That is, value co-creation through service-for-service exchange is at the very heart of society. It is also important to distinguish between co-production and the co-creation of value (Lusch and Vargo, 2006). Co-production refers to the customer's participation in the creation of the value-proposition (the firms offering), such as through co-design, customer-assembly, self-service, etc. Co-production is thus relatively optional and its advisability depends on a host of firm and customer conditions. This is different from co-creation of value, which is intended to capture the essential nature of value creation: it always involves the beneficiary's participation (through use, integration with other resources, etc.,) in some manner.

The third axiom (FP9) All social and economic actors are resource integrators highlights that all actors are, fundamentally, not only providing service but also integrating resources, from various resources (Vargo and Lusch, 2011, Wieland, Koskela-Huotari and Vargo, 2016). Thus, the concept of resource-integrator does not just apply to the actor typically referred to as a "producer" (e.g., the firm), but also, to a whole range of other actors, including what is usually referred to as the "consumer" or the "customer". It sets the stage for thinking about the mechanics and the networked nature of value co-creation, as well as the process through which the resources for service provision are created or emerge, the patterns of resource integration and the availability of resources from various market-facing, public, and private sources. It is through the resource integration and its many possible explicit and implicit combinations, facets, and intricacies that value is cocreated.

In the fourth axiom (FP10) of S-D logic, Value is always uniquely and phenomenologically determined by the beneficiary, the term 'beneficiary' reflects the generic nature of actors. In reciprocal service exchange all actors are both providers and beneficiaries. This axiom reinforces that value is experiential. The key message of this axiom is that all value propositions (e.g., goods, service provision, etc.) are perceived and integrated differently by each actor and thus, value is also uniquely experienced and determined. That is, value must be understood in terms of the holistic combination of resources that lead to it, in the context of other (potential) resources (Chandler and Vargo, 2011). It is thus always unique to a single actor and, it follows, can only be determined by that actor, or at least with the actor as the central referent.

The fifth axiom (FP11) Value cocreation is coordinated through actor-generated institutions and institutional arrangements draws attention to the role of institutions and the process of institutionalization in value cocreation. It is important to note that here the term institution does not refer to an organization. Instead, institutions are humanly devised rules, norms, and beliefs that enable and constrain action and make social life predictable and meaningful (Scott 2001; see also North 1990). Institutions and institutional arrangements—higher-order sets of interrelated institutions—enable actors to accomplish an ever-increasing level of service exchange and value cocreation under time and cognitive constraints in service ecosystems (Vargo and Lusch, 2016). This benefit, however, comes at a potential expense, as institutionalization can also lead to lock-in.

Service ecosystems perspective 
To fully unlock the complex nature of value cocreation within the society, S-D logic has recently introduced the concept of a service ecosystem (Lusch and Vargo, 2014, Vargo and Lusch, 2011). As actors specialize in providing ever more sophisticated configurations of applied resources for each other, the systemic dependencies and interdependencies among them result as the emergence of complex exchange systems (Chandler and Vargo, 2011, Vargo and Lusch, 2011). S-D logic uses the term 'ecosystems' to identify these systems because it denotes actor–environmental interaction and energy flow. More specifically, the term 'service ecosystem' is used to identify the particular kind of critical flow—mutual service provision (Vargo and Lusch, 2016). Service ecosystems are defined in S-D logic as "relatively self-contained, self-adjusting systems of resource-integrating actors connected by shared institutional arrangements and mutual value creation through service exchange." (Lusch and Vargo 2014; Vargo and Lusch 2016).

The service ecosystems concept is similar to the service systems concept of service science (Service science, management and engineering, e.g., Maglio et al. 2009), defined as "a configuration of people, technologies, and other resources that interact with other service systems to create mutual value". However, the service ecosystem definition in S-D logic emphasizes the more general role of institutions, rather than technology. Likewise, the service ecosystems conceptualization is somewhat similar to Layton's (e.g., 2011) conceptualization of a marketing system. However, he sees both knowledge and institutions as environmental, or exogenous, to marketing systems, whereas in S-D logic they are seen actor-generated and endogenous to service ecosystems (Vargo and Lusch, 2016).

Narrative 
The five axioms and the service ecosystems perspective help to communicate an S-D logic narrative of value cocreation – the central focus of this alternative worldview. This narrative is recursive over time, as actors integrate resources, provide reciprocal-service and cocreate value through "holistic, meaning-laden experiences in nested and overlapping service ecosystems, governed and evaluated through their institutional arrangements" (Vargo and Lusch 2016, p. 7)

Service platforms 
It is a modular structure that encompasses tangible and intangible components and facilitates the interaction of actors and resources. They exploit the liquefaction of resources and improve their density. They serve and are present in the daily exchanges of services between the actors.
There are two important aspects in service platforms:
Modular Layered Architecture and Resource Density: A united set of skills and specialized knowledge that easily connect with heterogeneous products.
The protocols or rules of exchange are a set of rules for the exchange of service and integration of resources in a service platform which affect the extent or the capacity to innovate in services and define which exchanges and which resources are valid. (Satish Nambisan, s.f.)

New service development 
Fitzsimmons describes innovation in two ways, the first as the process of creating something new and the second the result or the product of that process, which can be an improvement or a modification in an existing service.
Service innovations fall into two categories:
Radical innovations: which are the services, systems or proposals that did not exist before.
Incremental innovations: are improvements and changes in existing services.
The new service development cycle (NSD) is divided into two: the planning phase and the implementation phase.
In the planning phase enters what we know as: development and analysis while in the execution phase enters the design and launch.
The elements of the Services design are like a detailed blueprint that communicate customers with employees so they are aware of what is expected to be given and received. (Fitzsimmons, 2006)

Applications 
S-D logic was quickly adopted throughout the world of marketing and services research, and also many related research domains. For a complete overview of the dissemination and institutionalisation of S-D logic in research, see Ehrenthal, Gruen and Hofstetter (2021).

Within marketing, S-D logic has been applied to virtually all of its sub-disciplines. In supply chain management and logistics, scholars have started to think in terms of value networks and systems and focus on cocreation due to the influence of S-D logic (see e.g. Flint and Mentzer, 2006; Tokman and Beitelspacher, 2011, Yazdanparast, Manuj, and Swartz, 2010). S-D logic was also linked with branding and brand cocreation early on (Ballantyne and Aitken, 2007, Merz, He and Vargo, 2009) and identified as the natural ally of consumer culture theory (CCT) (Arnould, 2007). S-D logic is shown to facilitate a seamless integration of ethical accountability in marketing decision-making (Abela and Murphy, 2008) and used to guide practitioners to achieve and sustain strategic advantage (Bettencourt, Lusch, and Vargo, 2014). Recently, S-D logic has also been applied to marketing sub-disciplines such as international marketing (Akaka, Vargo, and Lusch, 2013) and social marketing (Luca, Hibbert, and McDonald, 2015; Russell-Bennett, Wood, and Previte, 2013).

The S-D logic framework has also found considerable resonance outside of marketing. S-D logic has been applied in such diverse fields as information systems (Alter, 2010), health disciplines (see e.g. Hardyman, Daunt, & Kitchener, 2015; Rehman, Dean, & Pires, 2012), arts philosophy (Boorsma, 2006), tourism management (see e.g. FitzPatrick, Davey, Muller, & Davey, 2013), public management (Osborne, Radnor, and Nasi, 2013) and innovation studies (Michel, Brown, and Gallan, 2008).

Recent research has introduced an instrument to measure the service-dominant logic orientation for service firms (Karoen, Bove, and Lukas, 2012). According to these authors firms possess certain capabilities to enact S-D logic in service exchanges and thereby co-create value. There are six service-driving capabilities which enables value co-creation which are relational interaction capability, ethical interaction capability, individuated interaction capability, empowered interaction capability, developmental interaction capability, and concerted interaction capability (Karpen, Bove, Lukas and Zyphur, 2015). The impact of S-D logic orientation on perceived value, trust and affective commitment was found to be positive. This research also showed a positive impact of S-D logic on market performance which further impacted financial performance of firms in the retail banking and automotive sectors.

Moreover, scholars are extending the S-D logic with applicable management tools such as the Service-Dominant Strategy Canvas ( Lüftenegger,  Comuzzi and Grefen, 2015) and the  Service-Dominant Business Model Radar ( Lüftenegger, 2014).

Conducting Service-Dominant logic research 
Analysing more than 1700 scientific publications using Service-dominant logic, Ehrenthal, Gruen and Hofstetter (2021) identify the following basic approaches, good practices, and quality criteria for conducting (and reviewing) Service-dominant logic research:

Conferences 
In 2005, an international group of academics led by David Ballantyne met to discuss these issues at The Otago Forum (2005, 2008, 2011), with special issues of major marketing journals emerging, as a consequence. Other international interest emerged that broadened to include service management and service science. This broadened interest is reflected in the Naples Forum on Service (2009, 2011, 2013 and 2015) that has a special focus on service systems and networks, service science and service-dominant logic. Lusch and Vargo, established the Forum on Markets and Marketing (FMM) to: (1) explore foundational and theoretical issues related to marketing, including the understanding of markets and marketing systems and (2) further the development of S-D logic. FMM has been held in 2008 at the University of New South Wales, in 2010 at Cambridge University, in 2012 at the University of Auckland, in 2014 at the CTF Service Research Center Karlstad University, Sweden and in 2016 in Venice by Warwick Manufacturing Group, University of Warwick.
It is common as well for major academic conferences in marketing and service research to have special sessions and/or invitations around S-D logic.

S-D Logic Award 
To recognize the contributions of individuals that have worked to advance the theory and practice of S-D Logic, Robert Lusch and Stephen Vargo established the S-D Logic Award. Recipients have included  Evert Gummesson: Evert Gummesson, Emeritus Professor, Stockholm University (2011 recipient),  Jim Spohrer: Jim Spohrer, Innovation Champion & Director, IBM (2013 recipient),  Irene Ng, Professor of Marketing and Service Systems, University of Warwick.

See also
Dominant logic

Notes

References 
 Abela, A. V., and Murphy, P. E. (2008). Marketing with integrity: ethics and the service-dominant logic for marketing. Journal of the Academy of Marketing Science, 36(1), 39–53. 
 Akaka, M. A., Vargo, S. L., and Lusch, R. F. (2013). The Complexity of Context: A Service Ecosystems Approach for International Marketing. Journal of International Marketing, 21(4), 1-20. doi:doi:10.1509/jim.13.0032
 Alter, S. (2010). Viewing systems as services: a fresh approach in the IS field. Communications of the association for information systems, 26(1), 196–224. 
 Arnould, E. J. (2007). Service-dominant logic and consumer culture theory: Natural allies in an emerging paradigm. In R. Belk, W. and J. Sherry Jr, F. (Eds.), Research in Consumer Behavior: Consumer Culture Theory (Vol. 11, pp. 57–78). Oxford, UK: JAI Press, Elsevier.
 Ballantyne, D., and Aitken, R. (2007). Branding in B2B markets: insights from the service-dominant logic of marketing. Journal of Business & Industrial Marketing, 22(6), 363–371. 
 Bettencourt, L. A., Lusch, R. F., and Vargo, S. L. (2014). A Service Lens on Value Creation. California Management Review", 57(1), 44–66. 
 Boorsma, M. (2006). A strategic logic for arts marketing: Integrating customer value and artistic objectives. International Journal of Cultural Policy, 12(1), 73–92. 
 Chandler, J. D., and Vargo, S. L. (2011). Contextualization and value-in-context: How context frames exchange. Marketing Theory, 11(1), 35–49.
 Ehrenthal J.C.F., Gruen T.W., Hofstetter J.S. (2021). Recommendations for Conducting Service-Dominant Logic Research. In: Dornberger R. (eds) New Trends in Business Information Systems and Technology. Studies in Systems, Decision and Control, vol 294. Springer, Cham, 281–297.  https://doi.org/10.1007/978-3-030-48332-6_19
 FitzPatrick, M., Davey, J., Muller, L., and Davey, H. (2013). Value-creating assets in tourism management: Applying marketing's service-dominant logic in the hotel industry. Tourism Management, 36(June), 86–98. 
 Flint, D. J., and Mentzer, J. T. (2006). Striving for integrated value chain management given a service-dominant logic for marketing. In R. F. Lusch and S. L. Vargo (Eds.), The service-dominant logic of marketing: Dialog, debate, and directions (pp. 139–149). Armonk, New York: ME Sharpe.
 Hardyman, W., Daunt, K. L., and Kitchener, M. (2015). Value co-creation through patient engagement in health care: a micro-level approach and research agenda. Public Management Review, 17(1), 90–107. 
 Karpen, I. O., Bove, L. L., & Lukas, B. A. (2012). Linking service-dominant logic and strategic business practice: A conceptual model of a service-dominant orientation. Journal of Service Research, 15(1), 21–38.
 Karpen, I. O., Bove, L. L., Lukas, B. A., & Zyphur, M. J. (2015). Service-dominant orientation: measurement and impact on performance outcomes. Journal of Retailing, 91(1), 89–108.
 Layton, R. A. (2011). Towards a theory of marketing systems. European Journal of Marketing, 45(1/2), 259–276. 
 Luca, N. R., Hibbert, S., and McDonald, R. (2015). Towards a service-dominant approach to social marketing. Marketing Theory. 
 Lüftenegger, E., Comuzzi, M., and Grefen, P. W. P. J. (2015). Designing a tool for service-dominant strategies using action design research. Service Business, 1-29. doi:10.1007/s11628-015-0297-7
 Lüftenegger, E. (2014). Service-Dominant Business Design. Eindhoven University of Technology. p. 179.  https://doi.org/10.6100/IR774591
 Lusch, R. and S. Vargo (2006). Service Dominant Logic: Reactions, Reflections, and Refinements, Marketing Theory 6 (3), 281–288.
 Lusch, R. F., and Vargo, S. L. (2014). Service-dominant logic: Premises, perspectives, possibilities. New York: Cambridge University Press.
 Maglio, P. P., Vargo, S. L., Caswell, N. and Spohrer, J. (2009). The service system is the basic abstraction of service science. Information Systems and e-Business Management, 7(4), 395–406.
 Merz, M. A., He, Y., and Vargo, S. L. (2009). The evolving brand logic: a service-dominant logic perspective. Journal of the Academy of Marketing Science, 37(3), 328–344.
 Michel, S., Brown, S. W., and Gallan, A. S. (2008). An expanded and strategic view of discontinuous innovations: deploying a service-dominant logic. Journal of the Academy of Marketing Science, 36(1), 54–66. 
 North, D. C. (1990). Institutions, institutional change, and economic performance. Cambridge: Cambridge University Press.
 Osborne, S. P., Radnor, Z., and Nasi, G. (2013). A new theory for public service management? Toward a (public) service-dominant approach. The American Review of Public Administration, 43(2), 135–158. 
 Rehman, M., Dean, A. M., and Pires, G. D. (2012). A research framework for examining customer participation in value co-creation: Applying the service dominant logic to the provision of living support services to oncology day-care patients. International Journal of Behavioural and Healthcare Research, 3(3-4), 226–243. 
 Russell-Bennett, R., Wood, M., and Previte, J. (2013). Fresh ideas: services thinking for social marketing. Journal of Social Marketing, 3(3), 223–238. 
 Scott, W. R. (2001). Institutions and organizations. Thousand Oaks: Sage.
 Tokman, M., and Beitelspacher, L. S. (2011). Supply chain networks and service-dominant logic: suggestions for future research. International Journal of Physical Distribution & Logistics Management, 41(7), 717–726. 
 Vargo, S. L., and Lusch, R. F. (2004). 'Evolving to a New Dominant Logic for Marketing', Journal of Marketing, 68(1), 1–17.
 Vargo, S. L., and Lusch, R. F. (2008). Service-dominant logic: continuing the evolution. Journal of the Academy of Marketing Science, 36(1), 1–10.
 Vargo, S. L., and Lusch, R. F. (2011). It's all B2B...and beyond: Toward a systems perspective of the market. Industrial Marketing Management, 40(2), 181–187.
 Vargo, S. L., and Lusch, R. F. (2016). Institutions and axioms: an extension and update of service-dominant logic. Journal of the Academy of Marketing Science, 44(4), 5-23. 
 Vargo, S. L., Maglio, P. P., and Akaka, M. A. (2008). On value and value co-creation: A service systems and service logic perspective. European Management Journal, 26(3), 145–152. 
 Wieland, H., Koskela-Huotari, K., and Vargo, S. L. (2016). Extending actor participation in value creation: an institutional view. Journal of Strategic Marketing, 24(3-4), 210–226.
 Yazdanparast, A., Manuj, I., and Swartz, S. M. (2010). Co-creating logistics value: a service-dominant logic perspective. The International Journal of Logistics Management, 21(3), 375–403.

 Further reading 
 "Selected Publications on Service-Dominant Logic"
 Gronroos, C. (2006). Adopting a Service Logic for Marketing, Marketing Theory, 6 (3), 317–333.
 Gronroos, C. (2011). Value co-creation in service logic: A critical analysis, Marketing Theory, 11(3), 279–301.
 Lusch, R.F., Vargo, S.L and O'Brien, M. (2007). Competing Through Service: Insights from Service-Dominant Logic, Journal of Retailing 83(1), 5–18.
 Lusch, R.F., Vargo, S.L and Wessels, G. (2008). Toward a Conceptual Foundation for Service Science: Contributions from Service-Dominant Logic," IBM Systems Journal 47(January–March), 5–14.
 Lusch, R.F., Vargo, S.L and Tanniru, M. (2010). Service, value networks and learning, Journal of the Academy of Marketing Science 38(1), 19–31.
 Lusch, R.F. (2011). Reframing Supply Chain Management: A Service-Dominant Logic Perspective, Journal of Supply Chain Management, 47, 14–18.
 Shostack, G. L. (1977). 'Breaking Free from Product Marketing', Journal of Marketing, 41(April), 73–80.
 Vargo, Stephen L. and Lusch, Robert F. (2004). 'The Four Service Marketing Myths: Remnants of a Goods-based Manufacturing Model', Journal of Service Research, 6(4), 324–335.
 Vargo, S. L., and Lusch, R. F. (2008) From goods to service(s): Divergences and convergences of logics, Industrial Marketing Management, 37(3), 254–259.
 Vargo, S. L., and Lusch, R. F. (2008) Why Service, Journal of the Academy of Marketing Science'', 36(Spring), 25–38.

External links 
 "S-D Logic Videos"

Services marketing